The black-crowned scimitar babbler (Pomatorhinus ferruginosus) is a species of bird in the family Timaliidae.

It is found in Bhutan, India, Nepal, and China. Its natural habitat is subtropical moist montane forest. It is normally 24 cm long and weighs 40-48g.

References

Collar, N. J. & Robson, C. 2007. Family Timaliidae (Babblers)  pp. 70 – 291 in; del Hoyo, J., Elliott, A. & Christie, D.A. eds. Handbook of the Birds of the World, Vol. 12. Picathartes to Tits and Chickadees. Lynx Edicions, Barcelona.

Pomatorhinus
Birds of Bhutan
Birds of Northeast India
Birds of Southeast Asia
Birds of Yunnan
Birds described in 1845
Taxa named by Edward Blyth
Taxonomy articles created by Polbot